This is a survey of the postage stamps and postal history of Kenya.

British colonial issues

Kenya used stamps of British East Africa Company (1890-1895), British East Africa (1895-1903), East Africa and Uganda Protectorates (1903-1922), Kenya and Uganda (1922-1935) and Kenya, Uganda and Tanganyika/Tanzania (1935-1976).

Independence
The first stamps of independent Kenya were issued on 12 December 1963. The stamps of Kenya were also valid in Uganda and Tanzania until 1976.

See also 
Postage stamps and postal history of British East Africa
Postage stamps and postal history of East Africa and Uganda Protectorates
Postage stamps and postal history of Kenya, Uganda, Tanganyika
Postage stamps and postal history of Tanzania
Postage stamps and postal history of Uganda
Revenue stamps of Kenya
Kenya Posts and Telecommunications Corporation
Postal Corporation of Kenya

References

Further reading
 Goldberg, Larry. Identifying the Cancellations of Kenya: A Post Office Identification Handbook. Buffalo Grove, IL.: LMG Communications, Inc., 2001  89p.
 Mackay, James A. East Africa: The Story of East Africa and its Stamps. London: Philatelic Publishers, Ltd., 1970 192p. Series Title: Collecta handbook ; no. 5.
 Mackay, James A. Kenya: The Story of Kenya and its Stamps. London: Kenya Posts and Telecommunications Corporation, 1981 192p. A reprint of the earlier title.
 Minns, John and Stuart Rossiter. The Cancellations of Kenya, 1890-1963; including British East Africa, the East Africa Protectorate, Kenya. s.l.: East Africa Study Circle, 1991  177p.
 Proud, Edward B. The Postal History of Kenya. Heathfield, East Sussex: Proud-Bailey Co. Ltd., 1992  368p.

Postal system of Kenya
Philately of Kenya